The men's high jump event at the 1969 European Indoor Games was held on 9 March in Belgrade.

Results

References

High jump at the European Athletics Indoor Championships
High